Faveria tritalis is a moth of the  family Pyralidae. It is known from Australia, including Queensland and the Australian Capital Territory, New South Wales and Victoria.

The wingspan is about 20 mm. Adults have forewings with a fawn pattern.

The larvae feed on various grasses, including Cynodon dactylon. They live in a silken shelter with incorporated leaves of the food plant.

References

Phycitini
Moths of Australia
Moths described in 1863